Alain Mikael Aprahamian Bakerdjian (born 26 January 1988) is a Uruguayan judoka.

He qualified to the 2020 Summer Olympics 81 kg tournament, where he lost at the round of 32.

His brother Pablo is also a judoka.

References

External links
 

1988 births
Living people
Uruguayan male judoka
Olympic judoka of Uruguay
Judoka at the 2020 Summer Olympics
21st-century Uruguayan people